Share Her Journey is a Canadian film program, created by the Toronto International Film Festival to foster the development and career advancement of women in the film industry.

First launched in 2017 as a five-year campaign to offer residency and talent accelerator programs for emerging women filmmakers, it became more widely known in 2018 when it organized a public rally on John Street near the TIFF Bell Lightbox to publicize and advocate for action on the issues that women in film still face, including sexual harassment and lack of opportunity.

Other initiatives sponsored by the organization include industry panels; developing and promoting mentorship, networking and career development opportunities for women in the film industry, efforts to include more films directed by women in the TIFF festival lineup, and a dedicated screening series of films directed by women at both the physical and online TIFF Bell Lightbox platforms, as well as a program to subsidize the media accreditation fees for women and people of colour to attend the festival as film reviewers.

The Share Her Journey Award, a prize to honour the best short film by an emerging female filmmaker in the festival's Short Cuts lineup, was introduced at the 2020 Toronto International Film Festival.

In 2021, which would have been the final year of Share Her Journey in its original form as a five-year initiative, the festival announced that it will be continued as a permanent program.

Beginning in 2022, Share Her Journey also launched the "Groundbreaker Award", presented as part of the TIFF Tribute Awards to honour a woman who has made a positive impact in improving conditions for women in the film industry, with the inaugural award presented to Michelle Yeoh.

Award winners

References

Toronto International Film Festival awards
Women's film organizations